Mother's Baby Boy is a 1914 American silent comedy film featuring Oliver Hardy.

Plot

Cast
 Eva Bell as Mother Pilkins
 Oliver Hardy as Percival Pilkins (as Babe Hardy)
 Nellie Farron as Nell Haldane
 Don Ferrando as Tom Brown
 Burt Bucher as Bill Green
 Royal Byron as Sport Regan (as Roy Byron)

See also
 List of American films of 1914
 Oliver Hardy filmography

External links

1914 films
1914 short films
American silent short films
American black-and-white films
1914 comedy films
Films directed by Arthur Hotaling
Silent American comedy films
American comedy short films
1910s American films